Enrico Maggioni (born 1 November 1946) is an Italian retired professional racing cyclist. He rode in the 1976 Tour de France.

References

External links
 

1946 births
Living people
Italian male cyclists
Cyclists from the Province of Lecco